Donald LaFayette Cunningham (April 21, 1866 – March 24, 1947) was one of the original Justices of the Supreme Court of Arizona, serving from February 14, 1912, to January 4, 1921. He served as chief justice from January 1918 to December 1929 and served as a member of Arizona's 1910 constitutional convention.

Early life and education
Cunningham was born in Gaylesville, Alabama on April 21, 1866. He graduated from Gaylesville High School and read law with John L. Burnett, a leading attorney and future member of Congress from Alabama. Cunningham was admitted to practice law in Centre, Alabama on December 23, 1887.

Career
In January 1888, Cunningham began to practice in Ashville, Alabama and was also editor of the "St. Clair Advance," a weekly newspaper. In February, 1889, he moved to Fort Payne and in 1893 to Colorado. He spent one year in Trinidad, then proceeded to Cripple Creek at the close of the "Bull Hill War." There he started a law practice, but after a few months took up mining and stock brokerage, and operated on the stock exchange.  In April, 1896, the town was mostly destroyed by a fire. Cunningham lost everything in the fire except for a single office chair; he later accepted a position as a salesman in a grocery store.

In 1897, Cunningham traveled to the Blue Mountains in Utah, where he flipped a coin to decide whether to travel to Idaho or Arizona. Arizona won, and Cunningham reached Flagstaff on August 14, 1897. There, Cunningham worked as a laborer for several months before briefly moving to Phoenix before he returned to Flagstaff, where he was employed for a time in the lumber mills and in the District Attorney's office. His later moved to Williams, where he opened a law office and was elected first City Attorney, practicing there several years. In 1904, while practicing in Tombstone, Cunningham married Louisa Leavenworth. He served as District Attorney of Cochise County, and was a Democrat County delegate to the Arizona Constitutional Convention, where he chaired the Judiciary Committee. At the convention he worked to defeat propositions that were "designed to prevent judges from enjoining labor interests involved in disputes with employers." Cunningham, along with Albert Baker and Alfred Franklin, have been called the "fathers of article XVIII, section 5," of Arizona's Constitution, which provides that juries will determine matters of contributory negligence.

Supreme Court
Cunningham's election to the Supreme Court has become part of Arizona folklore. While Cochise County Attorney shortly before Arizona was admitted as a state, Cunningham made public his ambition to become judge of the superior court. Reputedly, those who feared he might be elected as their superior court judge prevailed upon him to instead seek election to the Arizona Supreme Court. Cunningham sought election to the supreme court position and surprised his detractors by succeeding.

Cunningham took his seat on the Court on February 14, 1912, the date Arizona entered the union. He served as chief justice from January 1918 until December 1929, when he was succeeded by Henry D. Ross. Cunningham retired from the Court on January 4, 1921, when he was replaced by Archibald G. McAlister.

Death
Cunningham died in Willcox, Arizona on March 24, 1947.

References

Further reading
 
 John S. Goff, The Records of the Arizona Constitutional Convention of 1910, 1389–90 (1991)

1866 births
1947 deaths
People from Cherokee County, Alabama
Editors of Alabama newspapers
Arizona Democrats
Alabama lawyers
Chief Justices of the Arizona Supreme Court
U.S. state supreme court judges admitted to the practice of law by reading law
Justices of the Arizona Supreme Court